Susan Bradley-Cox (born November 9, 1937) is a triathlete from Paducah, Kentucky. She was named to the USA Triathlon Hall of Fame in 2011. In 1986, Bradley-Cox was 2nd at the Ironman World Championships. From 1989 to 2010, Bradley-Cox participated at the International Triathlon Union World championships. During these ITU championships, Bradley-Cox won 11 times and accumulated 18 medals. She won gold medals for the 50–54, 65–69, and 70–74 female age group. From 1997 to 1998, Bradley-Cox was chosen as the Athlete of the Year in the grand masters category by USA Triathlon.

In the US, Bradley-Cox earned 11 National Titles while racing at championships held by USA Triathlon. She has competed in over 200 triathlons since the beginning of her career in 1982. Bradley-Cox co-created the Susan Bradley-Cox Tri for Sight Triathlon. In 2014, Bradley-Cox was inducted into the Kentucky Sports Hall of Fame

For her coaching career, Bradley-Cox has worked in triathlon with the Kentucky Leukemia/Lymphoma Society and swimming  with the Wildcat Masters.
Bradley-Cox has been interviewed on the Champion of Active Women podcast as part of the Active Women's Health Initiative at the University of Kentucky.

ITU World Championship race results 

Source:

References 

 https://www.teamusa.org/USA-Triathlon/About/Multisport/Hall-of-Fame/Class-III

American female triathletes
Sportspeople from Paducah, Kentucky
1937 births
Living people
21st-century American women